Eremochloa ophiuroides, or centipedegrass, is a species of grass in the family Poaceae. Used as a warm season lawn grass, it forms thick sods and spreads by stolons. It is medium to light green in color and has a coarse texture with short upright seedhead stems that grow to about 3-5 inches. Native to Southern China, it was introduced to the United States in 1916 and has since become one of the common grasses in the Southeastern United States and Hawaii. It can also be considered a weed.

Cultivation
Centipedegrass is a low maintenance grass. It requires infrequent mowing. Centipedegrass has medium shade tolerance and limited traffic tolerance.

It is shallow rooted and has poor drought tolerance. Centipedegrass survives in mild climates without several hard freezes. With light freezes it will turn brown but recover and re-green as the temperature rises. It does well in sandy and acidic soils. Centipede grass has low fertilization requirements.

References

External links
Centipede Lawns - The University of Georgia College of Agricultural & Environmental Sciences

Andropogoneae
Flora of Asia
Lawn grasses